Bernard Krisher (August 9, 1931 – March 5, 2019) was a German-born American journalist and philanthropist.

Biography
Krisher was born in Frankfurt. His family left Germany in 1937 when he was six and travelled via Paris and Lisbon, eventually settling in New York City in January 1941. At age 12, Krisher published his own magazine and edited his high school and Queens College newspapers. Later he worked for the New York Herald Tribune and the New York World-Telegram & Sun.

After graduating from college, Krisher was drafted into the U.S. Army during the Korean War but due to his German language skills was stationed in Heidelberg at the US Army's press and information division. In 1958 he visited Japan for the first time. From 1959 to 1960 Krisher spent a year doing Japanese area and language studies at Columbia University as a Ford Foundation Advanced International Reporting Fellow. He joined Newsweek 's Tokyo bureau first as a stringer and eventually became bureau chief until 1980. In 1975 he was the first and only journalist ever do a to a one-on-one interview for publication with the Japanese Emperor Hirohito (Tenno Showa). He was a member of the Council on Foreign Relations.

After retiring from Newsweek, Krisher joined Fortune Magazine as its Tokyo correspondent and at the same time joined Shinchosha, a large Japanese publishing company, as its chief editorial advisor. There he worked on the groundbreaking and wildly successful weekly FOCUS magazine in 1981. Focus magazine reached peak editions of up to 2 million per week in its heyday.

Krisher was the Far East representative of the MIT Media Lab. As such, he collaborated with Nicholas Negroponte, who was also one of the first to sponsor a school in Cambodia in Krisher's signature school building project.

On 5 March 2019, Krisher died at a hospital in Tokyo at the age of 87.

Philanthropy 
In 1993, Krisher founded and became chairman of American Assistance for Cambodia, a non-profit organization aimed at giving hope to the Cambodian people following the extermination of 2 million Cambodians during the Khmer Rouge regime.
 Krisher launched the charity Sihanouk Hospital Center of HOPE which treats the poor for free. By 2013 he'd built over 550 schools, many of them with matching funds from the World Bank and Asian Development Bank. He also founded and published The Cambodia Daily, a newspaper dedicated to setting up a sound foundation for a free press and training journalists. The Cambodia Daily was shut down by the Cambodian government in 2017, but continues to publish online. In 2008, Krisher also founded The Burma Daily which aimed to replicate the ideals and success of The Cambodia Daily.

Publications
 with Norodom Sihanouk: "Sihanouk Reminisces: World Leaders I Have Known", Editions Duang Kamol; Bangkok, 1990 
 Japan as we lived it: can East and West ever meet? Tokyo, Japan : Yohan Publications, 1989
 with Osamu Senna: Intabyū : Tennō kara Fuwa Tetsuzō made (インタビュ一 : 天皇から不破哲三まで /) Tokio, Saimaru Shuppankai (サイマル出版会,) 1976
 with Eiichi Aoki Harvard Conversation - Hābādo no mita Nippon : Nihon wa nyūrīdā ni nareru ka? (ハーバードのみたニッポン : 日本はニューリーダーになれるか?) Tokio, Gurobyūsha (グロビュー社,) 1979

Honors
 Recipient of the Second Iue Asia Pacific Culture Prize 2003
 Healing Cambodia Award, 2011
 Medal of Grand Officier de l'Ordre royal du Cambodge, 2008

References

External links
  "Backstory: To help Cambodians is Bernie's law", The Christian Science Monitor / November 30, 2006
 Time Asia Heroes article
 Cambodia Schools website
 Map locations of each rural school
 Sihanouk Hospital Center of HOPE
 Village Leap
 Bright Future Kids
 Girls Be Ambitious
 The Burma Daily newspaper
 The Cambodia Daily newspaper

1931 births
2019 deaths
American male journalists
Jewish American philanthropists
Jewish emigrants from Nazi Germany to the United States
American expatriates in Japan
Journalists from New York City
People from Hesse-Nassau
20th-century American philanthropists
21st-century American Jews